Amecomycter is a genus of beetles in the family Mauroniscidae, historically included in the family Melyridae. The six known species of this genus are found in South America in the countries of Argentina, Chile, and Peru.

Species
 Amecomycter argentinus (Pic, 1928)
 Amecomycter bicoloripennis (Pic, 1928)
 Amecomycter crassus Majer, 1995
 Amecomycter pallidicolor (Pic, 1910)
 Amecomycter rugicollis Majer, 1995
 Amecomycter vitticollis Majer, 1995

References

Cleroidea
Cleroidea genera